Shelby Newkirk (born 25 June 1996) is a Canadian Paralympic swimmer who competes in international elite competitions. She is a World Para Swimming Championships medalist and has been selected to compete at the 2020 Summer Paralympics.

References

External links
 
 

1996 births
Living people
Sportspeople from Saskatoon
Paralympic swimmers of Canada
Medalists at the World Para Swimming Championships
Swimmers at the 2020 Summer Paralympics
Canadian female freestyle swimmers
Canadian female backstroke swimmers
S7-classified Paralympic swimmers